Dobitschen is a municipality in the Altenburger Land district, in the far eastern part of Thuringia, Germany. It borders on the municipalities Schmölln, Göllnitz, Mehna and Starkenberg. It is subdivided into the Ortsteile Dobitschen, Meucha, Pontewitz and Rolika.

History
Within the German Empire (1871–1918), Dobitschen was part of the Duchy of Saxe-Altenburg. From 1952 to 1990, it was part of the Bezirk Leipzig of East Germany.

Historical population

Persons
Johann Friedrich Agricola

References

Altenburger Land
Duchy of Saxe-Altenburg